Chasing Girls (Chinese: 追女仔) is a 1981 Hong Kong romantic comedy film directed by Karl Maka and starring Dean Shek, Flora Cheong-Leen, Nancy Lau and Eric Tsang. It was the second film produced by Cinema City, a film company established by Shek, producer/director Maka and screenwriter Raymond Wong.

Plot 

Robert fails school while studying abroad in America, because he spent too much time flirting with American girls and not enough time studying. Robert's mother, angry that her son has failed school, sends him back to Hong Kong to live with his aunt in hopes that he will marry a Chinese girl.

Returning to Hong Kong does not change Robert; he continues to spend all day flirting. His average-looking younger cousin, Ko Lo-chuen, wants to date a film star, Lam Siu-ha. Robert seems to be helping his cousin pursue her, but actually he wants to date her himself.

One night at a  party, Robert notices a pretty rich girl named Fa who is working as a waitress. Ha sees Robert flirting with Fa, and, understandably hurt, she lambastes Fa, even though Robert tells her that nothing happened.

Fa is upset by Ha's behavior, and goes to her father to complain about her treatment. Robert's father then advises her on how to ruin Robert and Ha's relationship.

Cast

Reception 

The film grossed HK$9,464,742 at the Hong Kong box office during its theatrical run from 7 to 26 August 1981 in Hong Kong

External links 

 
 Chasing Girls at Hong Kong Cinemagic
 

1981 films
1981 romantic comedy films
Hong Kong romantic comedy films
Hong Kong slapstick comedy films
1980s Cantonese-language films
Films set in Hong Kong
Films shot in Hong Kong
Films set in New York (state)
Films shot in New York (state)
Films about actors
1980s Hong Kong films